Viherlaakso (Finnish) or Gröndal (Swedish) is a district of Espoo, a city in Finland.

See also
 Districts of Espoo

External links
Photo of Forest in Viherlaakso at Panoramio

Districts of Espoo